Blenheim is a town in Schoharie County, New York, United States. The population was 377 at the 2010 census. The town was named after a land patent, which itself was named after the Battle of Blenheim.

The Town of Blenheim is in the southwestern part of the county and is east of Oneonta, New York.

History 
The town was the site of raids and skirmishes during the American Revolution.

The town was one of the original six towns of the county, created in 1797 from Schoharie. In 1803, part of Blenheim was used to create the Town of Jefferson. Another part of Blenheim was taken in 1848 to form part of the new Town of Gilboa.

The town had one of the world's longest wooden single-span covered bridges (at 232 feet), the Old Blenheim Bridge. It was built in 1855 and existed until 2011, when it was destroyed by flooding caused by Tropical Storm Irene.

The Lansing Manor House and North Blenheim Historic District are listed on the National Register of Historic Places.

Notable people
 Julia E. B. Brick, philanthropist
 John A. King, former governor of New York
 Alonzo A. Loper, Wisconsin state legislator
 Stephen L. Mayham, U.S. Congressman
 E. Woolsey Peck, Chief Justice of the Alabama Supreme Court

Geography

The Schoharie Creek flows through the town.

New York State Route 30 is a north-south highway in the eastern part of Blenheim.

Demographics

As of the census of 2000, there were 330 people, 150 households, and 97 families residing in the town. The population density was 9.7 people per square mile (3.8/km2). There were 303 housing units at an average density of 8.9 per square mile (3.4/km2). The racial makeup of the town was 96.97% White, 1.52% African American, 0.30% from other races, and 1.21% from two or more races. Hispanic or Latino of any race were 2.12% of the population.

There were 150 households, out of which 24.7% had children under the age of 18 living with them, 50.7% were married couples living together, 7.3% had a female householder with no husband present, and 34.7% were non-families. 28.7% of all households were made up of individuals, and 18.0% had someone living alone who was 65 years of age or older. The average household size was 2.20 and the average family size was 2.64.

In the town, the population was spread out, with 18.8% under the age of 18, 4.2% from 18 to 24, 24.2% from 25 to 44, 33.3% from 45 to 64, and 19.4% who were 65 years of age or older. The median age was 48 years. For every 100 females, there were 100.0 males. For every 100 females age 18 and over, there were 94.2 males.

The median income for a household in the town was $38,500, and the median income for a family was $44,821. Males had a median income of $32,321 versus $24,167 for females. The per capita income for the town was $20,993. About 5.9% of families and 8.5% of the population were below the poverty line, including 3.8% of those under age 18 and 14.5% of those age 65 or over.

Communities and locations in Blenheim 
Cole Hollow – A valley near the northern town line.
Eminence – A hamlet on the northwestern town line.
Mine Kill State Park – A state park in the southeastern part of the town.
North Blenheim – A hamlet in the eastern part of the town on NY-30.
Ruth – A hamlet in the southwestern part of the town on County Road 12.

Politics 
The elected town supervisor of Blenheim is Don Airey.

References

External links
  Official Blenheim site
  County, Blenheim Information
  Town of Blenheim, NY
  Early history of Blenheim, NY
  Waterfalls of Blenheim, NY

Towns in Schoharie County, New York